Copelatus virungaensis is a species of diving beetle. It is part of the subfamily Copelatinae in the family Dytiscidae. It was described by Bilardo in 1982.

References

virungaensis
Beetles described in 1982